Westward Ho is a 1935 American Western film directed by Robert N. Bradbury. It stars John Wayne and Sheila Bromley, with Yakima Canutt in a supporting role. Released by the recently created Republic Pictures, it was produced by Paul Malvern who had previously released his John Wayne Lone Star Westerns for Monogram Pictures. According to AllMovie, it is the earliest revisionist Western – the hero, John Wyatt (Wayne), leads a band of vigilantes on a quest for revenge.

Plot
Whit Ballard and his gang of outlaws steal a herd of cattle from the Wyatts, a family of drovers, murdering the parents. In the aftermath, Ballard takes a shine to one of the boys, Jim (Frank McGlynn, Jr., as an adult) and decides to take him along for kicks, but leaves behind his brother John (John Wayne, as an adult). Once grown up, in an effort to chase down the men who killed his parents and kidnapped his brother, John organizes a frontier Vigilante group of cowboys (who sing, wear black and ride white horses) to bring outlaws to justice, and they become renowned for their success.

John joins on as a hand with a cattle herding family, and takes a particular shine to the lovely and sassy daughter Mary (Bromley). Jim (unrecognized by John), using the surname Allen, has also infiltrated the family, to provide intel to Ballard to assist stealing the cattle. John smells a rat, and rides away in the middle of the night, returning with his vigilantes in time to foil the outlaws's plan to rob the family. In the confusion of the gunplay and fighting, Jim manages to make it appear as if he saved the father, and stays unknown as a Ballard confidante. Interrogating one of the outlaws, John discovers that Ballard is the man responsible for killing his family. He lets the outlaw go but tells him to stay out of the local town where Ballard is laying up.

John heads to town and recognizes the same outlaw. He starts a fight, but other outlaws join in and he is badly outnumbered. John makes a derring-do escape over roof tops, riding off to again retrieve his vigilantes. Meanwhile Jim tricks Mary into going to Ballard's hideout, where she is locked into a room. Ballard has a ransom note sent to John instructing him to come alone to a canyon if he wants her back. When John gets the note, he rides off alone to the canyon, leaving the vigilantes behind. Meanwhile, Ballard's gang robs the gold from the town bank and sets off for the canyon. Jim sees them ride off, abandoning him, and goes to the hideout, where he frees Mary, who tells him she overheard Ballard saying John is his brother and left Jim behind before he could discover that.

Knowing a trap awaits John at the canyon, Jim rides off to the canyon while Mary rides off to get the vigilantes. Jim arrives at the canyon, and as John rides in, yells to warn him of the trap and stalls the waiting outlaws in a shootout. Jim joins John and tells him they are brothers, and the two try to escape on horseback. Their path intersects with Ballard in a wagon with the stolen gold, just as the vigilantes also arrive and engage the outlaws in a mobile shootout on horseback. John jumps aboard the wagon and fights Ballard, jumping off just before the wagon careens down an embankment, killing Ballard. John rushes back to Jim, who was shot in the action. Jim dies in John's arms, poignantly rueful of his bad ways.

John tells Mary he is disbanding the group and leaving to become a California rancher. Mary kisses him as she calls him a "muttonhead", their pet name for each other, and it is apparent that she will be going with him.

Cast
 John Wayne as John Wyatt
 Sheila Bromley as Mary Gordon
 Frank McGlynn Jr. as Jim Wyatt
 Jim Farley as Lafe Gordon (herd owner)
 Jack Curtis as Whit Ballard
 Bradley Metcalfe as John Wyatt as a child
 Dickie Jones as Jim Wyatt as a child
 Mary MacLaren as Ma Wyatt
 Yakima Canutt as Red (Ballard henchman)
 Hank Bell as Mark Wyatt
 Glenn Strange as Carter (singing rider)

See also
 John Wayne filmography

References

External links
 
 }
 
 

1935 films
1935 Western (genre) films
American Western (genre) films
American black-and-white films
1930s English-language films
Films directed by Robert N. Bradbury
Films shot in Lone Pine, California
Republic Pictures films
Revisionist Western (genre) films
1930s American films